Bolen is an unincorporated community in Ware County, in the U.S. state of Georgia.

History
A post office called Bolen was established in 1886, and remained in operation until 1913. The community had a depot on the Nicholls and Waycross division of the Atlantic and Birmingham Railroad.

References

Unincorporated communities in Ware County, Georgia